WANV (96.7 FM) is a radio station licensed to Annville, Kentucky, United States, and serving London.  The station is owned by Forcht Broadcasting as part of a triopoly with classic country station WFTG (1400 AM) and Hot AC outlet WWEL (103.9 FM). All three stations share studios on Tobacco Road in northern London, while WANV maintains transmission facilities off Fence Road between London and Annville. The station features programming from CBS News Radio.

Programming

WANV airs a broad Oldies format, bordering close to the classic hits genre. The station's music catalog stretches from the 1960s up to the early 2000s. WANV airs one locally-based on-air program, The Morning Show, hosted by Dave Begley.

History
The station went on the air as WANK on May 1, 2006. On May 3, 2006, the station changed its call sign to the current WANV.

References

External links

ANV
Jackson County, Kentucky
2006 establishments in Kentucky
Radio stations established in 2006